Beginning with the Industrial Revolution era, a workshop may be a room, rooms or building which provides both the area and tools (or machinery) that may be required for the manufacture or repair of manufactured goods. Workshops were the only places of production until the advent of industrialization and the development of larger factories. In the 20th and 21st century, many Western homes contained a workshop in either the garage, basement, or an external shed. Home workshops typically contain a workbench, hand tools, power tools, and other hardware. Along with the practical application of repairing goods, workshops are often used to tinker and make prototypes. 

Some workshops focus exclusively on automotive repair or restoration although there are a variety of workshops in existence today.  Woodworking, metalworking, electronics, and other types of electronic prototyping workshops are among the most common.

Backshop

In some repair industries, such as locomotives and aircraft, the repair operations have specialized workshops called back shops or railway workshops. Most repairs are carried out in small workshops, except where an industrial service is needed.)

See also
 Hackspace
 Laboratory
 Machine shop, with machines for metalworking
 Skylab orbital workshop
 Studio
 The New Yankee Workshop

References

Reuse
Workshops